Mundiyath Devdas (born 12 March 1935) was a former Indian association football player. He was part of the team that played in the 1960 Summer Olympics.

References

External links
 

1935 births
Living people
Footballers at the 1960 Summer Olympics
Olympic footballers of India
Indian footballers
India international footballers
Footballers from Kerala
Association football forwards